Julius Plücker, German mathematician and physicist
 29643 Plücker, main-belt asteroid
 Plücker Line
 Plücker matrix